The Armidale School (abbreviated as TAS) is an independent Anglican co-educational early learning, primary and secondary day and boarding school, located in Armidale, on the New England Tablelands of northern New South Wales, Australia. Administration of the schools is formalised as a company limited by guarantee that operates under the Corporations Act.

Founded in 1894 as the New England Proprietary School, The Armidale School has a non-selective enrolment policy and currently caters for approximately 640 students, including 250 boarders from Years 6 to 12. TAS has classes of students in Pre-Kindergarten (4 years old), Junior School for children in Kindergarten to Year 5 which offers the IB Primary Years Programme, a Middle School for those in Years 6 to 8 (offering the IB Middle Years Programme) and a Senior School from Years 9 to 12 (18 years old). In 1993, The Armidale School became the first school in Australia to provide internet access for its students.

The School is affiliated with the Association of Heads of Independent Schools of Australia (AHISA), the Junior School Heads Association of Australia (JSHAA), the Australian Boarding Schools' Association (ABSA), and is one of only three Round Square schools in the state of New South Wales. TAS is also the only member of the Athletic Association of the Great Public Schools of New South Wales (AAGPS) located outside of the Sydney metropolitan area.

History
The Armidale School was founded in 1894 as a boarding school primarily for the sons of the gentry, however the origins of the school can be traced to 1838, when Patrick Grant, a magistrate at Maitland, conceived the idea of a proprietary school for boys in the Hunter Region. This idea was taken over by prominent members of the Church of England in the northern districts of New South Wales, and 500 pounds was obtained from the Society for Promoting Christian Knowledge, as a result of the efforts of the first (and only) Bishop of Australia, William Grant Broughton. In 1840, a site for the school was purchased at Honeysuckle Point, in Newcastle. Nothing more came of the plan until the appointment of William Tyrrell, as the first Bishop of Newcastle in 1846. The property was passed on to Tyrrell, and in 1854 the land was resumed by the Hunter River Railway Company.

By 1877, the school had still not been established, and Bishop Tyrrell began to push the matter further. Subsequently, a plan was drawn up and land selected at Blandford, near Murrurundi. In 1881, it was determined that the plan to build the school at Blandford was unaffordable, and a suggestion was made that it should be built on the New England Tablelands at Armidale. The additional capital required, to the amount of 6,000 pounds, was raised by James Ross, Archdeacon of Armidale, and his leading laymen.

On 5 June 1891, The New England Proprietary School Limited (NEPS) was incorporated with 100 pound shares, offered at 50 pounds each, allowing each shareholder to nominate one pupil for each share purchased. The Directors purchased  in Armidale in September 1891, adding to the  obtained in 1889.
The foundation stone of the main building, designed by noted architect Sir John Sulman, was laid on 22 February 1893, by the Governor of New South Wales, the Rt. Hon. Victor Albert George, Earl of Jersey. The Opening Ceremony was performed by the Rt. Rev Arthur Vincent Green, Bishop of Grafton and Armidale on 15 May 1894.

The name of the company and School was changed in 1896 to The Armidale School (TAS). Also that year, TAS joined the Athletic Association of the Great Public Schools of New South Wales (GPS) in Sydney, and has remained a member ever since.

In 1950, the School site was transferred to the Trustees of the Church of England Diocese of Armidale, and was administered by a School Council comprising members from the Diocese, Old Boys' Union and P&F. through to 2009.

On 1 January 2010 the School was incorporated as a company limited by guarantee under the Corporations Act with the name: The Armidale School.

In March 2015, the School announced it would commence full co-education, and began taking enrolments for Year 12 students, who would begin tuition in October 2015, and for Year 6-11 students, to begin tuition in 2016. This expanded upon an already co-educational Junior School, and was announced following a nine-week consultation process. The school started 2016 with 53 girls, including 14 boarders. By the start of 2022, girl enrolments accounted for around 40 percent of total enrolments.

Headmasters

Campus

The Armidale School is situated on a single  campus in Armidale, a university city on the New England Tablelands of New South Wales, midway between Sydney and Brisbane. The school features a mix of historic and modern buildings, all of which reflect design elements of the outstanding original building designed by noted architect Sir John Sulman in 1892. Other notable buildings are the 1902 Chapel, designed by Cyril Blacket, and the War Memorial Assembly Hall, which features three magnificent stained glass windows designed by Napier Waller.

The facilities of the school include the Michael Hoskins Creative Arts Centre, which incorporates a 240-seat performing arts theatre, drama classrooms and visual arts studios. The centre is used by various local and visiting performing arts organisations including as the 'home' of the Armidale Drama & Music Society. Other facilities include a heated indoor swimming pool, rifle range, cattle stud, chapel, gymnasium, library, music centre, computer rooms, climbing wall, weights room, an indoor cricket centre, several indoor and outdoor basketball courts, seven tennis courts, rugby and soccer fields, and cricket wickets.

Boarding
TAS currently has six school boarding houses, named Abbott, Croft, Dangar, Tyrrell, and White, and an as yet unnamed 64-bed girls' boarding house which opened its doors in 2018.
The senior boys' boarding houses (Abbott, Croft and Tyrrell) each accommodate up to 60 students, with 10 to 15 boys in each year group. In the lower years boys are accommodated in dormitories, and as they progress through the school are moved into private study/bedrooms. Middle School boys are accommodated in White House, while Middle School girl boarders reside in Dangar House, the school's original primary school.

Co-curricular Activities
Co-curricular activities available to TAS students include: Debating and public speaking, drama, band, orchestra, choirs, art, photography, Duke of Edinburgh's Award Scheme, and a school Poll Hereford stud which exhibits cattle at local and regional agricultural shows. Annual theatrical productions are staged in the School's Hoskins Centre theatre; previous productions include The Addams Family (2018), Oliver! (2019), Wizard of Oz (2019), Sweeney Todd (2020) and Rhinoceros (2022).

Community service
It is an expectation of TAS that all students must commit to at least 20 hours of community service per year, both in the local and wider community.

Year 8 students may volunteer for a service trip to St Christopher's orphanage in Fiji, where they participate in the upkeep and daily maintenance of the orphanage and establish friendships with the children. In the past, a similar Christian service trip has been offered to Year 10 and 11 students to Thailand, assisting at the McKean Leprosy Rehabilitation Centre and the Agape AIDS Orphanage near Chang Mai. Other service offerings have included a visit to helping indigenous boys and girls at Yipirinya School in Alice Springs, Northern Territory. Locally, for more than a decade senior TAS students have participated in a lunchtime reading and play program with the neighbouring Minimbah Primary School, an independent school in east Armidale with a predominantly Indigenous student enrolment. Other student-led initiatives include donating blood to the NSW Red Cross Blood Bank and support raising awareness for mental health most recently through not-for-profit social agency, Batyr.

Sport

The Armidale School is one of the nine members of the Athletic Association of the Great Public Schools of New South Wales (GPS) and participates in some GPS sporting competitions as well as several non-GPS or traditional sports. TAS students may participate in a variety of sports including: athletics, basketball, canoeing, cricket, cross country, hockey, mountain biking, netball, rugby union, rifle shooting, soccer, squash, rowing, swimming, tennis, triathlon, and water polo.

In April each year, the school hosts more than 40 school and club teams at the TAS Rugby Carnival, the largest primary-aged rugby carnival in Australia.

The school also holds a swimming carnival and an athletics carnival once a year, with students participating in inter-house competition. Boarding students compete for either Abbott, Croft or Tyrrell house, while day students are members of Broughton, Green or Ross houses. Broughton was originally a boarding house; Green and Ross were inaugurated in 1983 by Prince Edward, during a private visit to the school. Inter-house competitions are also held for debating, public speaking, and the creative arts.

Leadership, Service & Adventure
The Armidale School has a leadership, service and adventure program which has an emphasis on outdoor education and is designed to develop a sense of responsibility and self-confidence through activities such as abseiling, whitewater kayaking and bivouacs. Outdoor education activities in which students may participate in, include the following:

Cadets
Founded in 1898 and one of the longest-running cadet units in Australia, the TAS Cadet Unit is part of the Australian Army Cadet Corps. This activity is compulsory for students in Years 8 to 10, and is voluntary for Years 11 onwards. It involves drill and ceremonial work, and Outward Bound training. A Ceremonial Guard provides a catafalque party each year at ANZAC Day and Remembrance Day services in Armidale and at school, and the TAS Cadet band operates for the annual cadet unit passing out parade.

Rural Fire Service
In 1970 TAS became the first school in NSW to offer bush firefighter training, originally as part of the service component for the school's Duke of Edinburgh Award. The school's RFS program aims to produce students who are competent in aspects of bush firefighting, and who take an active role in helping their community by obtaining a Bush Firefighting (BF) qualification. The activity is carried out in conjunction with the Dumaresq Brigade of the NSW Rural Fire Service New England Zone and at the RFS' Armidale Fire Training Centre.

Surf Life Saving
Surf life saving commenced at TAS in 1967, as a service component for the Duke of Edinburgh Award Scheme introduced at the school earlier that year. For the first few years, the boys did their training at Nambucca Heads, and during the 1990s, with Yamba SLSC. Currently the relationship is with Sawtell SLSC, where students spend several days during the year and then an intensive week of training and assessment in November. Students are instructed in inshore boat rescue - crewing, patient pick-ups and assessment, related signals, radio, equipment and safety; first aid - CPR; board rescues, tube rescues, patient care, patient carries, etc. This program culminates in an examination for their RLSSA Surf Life Saving Bronze Medallion.

Expeditions 
As part of the school's adventure program a number of expeditions have taken place including five treks of the Kokoda Track in Papua New Guinea, the Sea to Summit cycle ride from Pambula to the peak of Mount Kosciuszko, and to Antarctica.

Other 
The TAS Triple Crown was instigated in 2014 as an award given to those students who complete three adventure events during their time at the school - the 2 km Coffs Harbour Ocean Swim, the 14 km City to Surf footrace in Sydney, and the 111 km overnight Hawkesbury Canoe Classic. Other events that are recognised for the award include Tour de Rocks, a 255 km charity cycle ride from Armidale to South West Rocks. Those who complete three in the one year are awarded the Gold Triple Crown.

Round Square 
TAS is a member of Round Square, an international organisation of more than 200 schools worldwide which subscribes to the philosophy of Kurt Hahn (1886-1974), a renowned educationalist, who founded the idea of experiential education through such initiatives as the Duke of Edinburgh’s Award Scheme and Outward Bound. The philosophy is based on five pillars or IDEALS: Internationalism, Democracy, Environment, Adventure, Leadership and Service. The Round Square network affords member schools the opportunity to arrange local and international student and teacher exchanges on a regular basis between their schools. Students and staff also have the opportunity to participate in local and international community service projects and conferences.

Notable alumni 

Alumnus of The Armidale School are referred to generally as Old Armidalians, Old Boys or Old Girls (following the introduction of co-education in 2015) and may elect to join the schools' alumni association, the Old Armidalians' Union (formerly TAS Old Boys' Union). Some notable Old Armidalians include:

Rhodes scholar
 Robert Clarence Robertson-Cuninghamelater Chancellor of the University of New England

Business
James Keith Bain company director, farmer, author, chairman of Merryville Estates Pty Ltd, NatWest Aust. Bank Ltd (1985–91), W. Bain & Co. (1947–87), Sydney Stock Exchange Ltd (1983–87) (also attended The Scots College)

Media, entertainment and the arts
 Alex Buzoplaywright
 Peter Cousensmusical theatre performer
 Gus Gordonillustrator and children's writer
 Ian Kiernan environmentalist and around the world yachtsman (also attended The Scots College)
 Nigel Brennan - Photojournalist and author who was kidnapped by Islamist insurgents in Somalia in 2008 and held hostage for 15 months
 Ben MingayTV and film actor
 Angus SampsonTV and film actor who appeared in Kokoda and Thank God You're Here

Politics, public service and the law
 Sir Arnold Ametformer Chief Justice of Papua New Guinea
 Sir Kina Bona Judge, National and Supreme Courts of Papua New Guinea
 Lieutenant Colonel Sir Michael Bruxnerleader of the New South Wales Country Party, Deputy Premier and Member of the NSW Parliament from 1920–1962
 Lieutenant General Sir Leslie Morshead military leader who led the Australian and British troops at the Siege of Tobruk (1941) and at the Second Battle of El Alamein (TAS Staff)
 Don Pageformer Member of NSW Parliament for State seat of Ballina
 George Sourisformer Member of NSW Parliament for State seat of Upper Hunter and former NSW Government Minister
Dave Layzell - Member of NSW Parliament for State seat of Upper Hunter - NSW Nationals
 William Wentworth Liberal member of the Australian House of Representatives

Science
 Professor Jonathan Sprent FRS - Immunologist with the Garvan Institute of Medical Research

Sport
 Greg Cornelsenformer rugby player capped 25 times for the Wallabies
 Sir Bernard Croftplayed Rugby Union for Australia in the 1928 New Zealand tour
Allan Grice - racing driver and politician, most famous for twice winning the prestigious Bathurst 1000 (1986 and 1990), and Member for Broadwater in the Queensland Parliament from 1992 to 2001
 Joe Roffformer rugby player for the ACT Brumbies (1996-04) and capped 86 times for the Wallabies
 Richard Tombsformer rugby player capped five times for the Wallabies

Other
 Sir Patrick Gordon Taylorpioneering aviator and author

See also 

 List of Anglican schools in New South Wales
 Anglican education in Australia
 List of boarding schools in Australia
 Lawrence Campbell Oratory Competition

References

External links
 The Armidale School website
NSW Rhodes Scholars

Educational institutions established in 1894
Boarding schools in New South Wales
Round Square schools
Anglican primary schools in New South Wales
Anglican secondary schools in New South Wales
Boys' schools in New South Wales
Junior School Heads Association of Australia Member Schools
Schools in Armidale, New South Wales
1894 establishments in Australia
Lists of people educated in New South Wales by school affiliation
Athletic Association of the Great Public Schools of New South Wales